Acacia is a genus of shrubs and trees of Gondwanian origin, belonging to the subfamily Mimosoideae of the family Fabaceae. 

Other genera formerly included under Acacia, and still sometimes referred to by that name (or as Acacia sensu lato, include:
Vachellia
Senegalia
Mariosousa
Acaciella

Acacia may also refer to:
 Acacia (band), a British pop band from the 1990s
 Acacia (film), a 2003 South Korean horror film
 Acacia: The War with the Mein, a novel by American author David Anthony Durham
 Acacia Avenue, a placeholder name for an English suburban road
 Acacia (fraternity), a social fraternity based on Masonic traditions
 Acacia Mining, an English mining company operating in Tanzania
 Acacia Prison, a private prison in Western Australia
 Acacia Research, a patent enforcement entity
 Gum acacia, another name for Gum arabic
 USCGC ACACIA (WLB-406)
 USS Acacia, a steam-powered tugboat in the service of the US Navy during the American Civil War
 2S3 Akatsiya, Russian for acacia, a Soviet 152.4 mm self-propelled artillery

Places
 Acacías, a town and municipality of Meta Department, Colombia
 Las Acacias (Madrid), a ward of Madrid, Spain
 Las Acacias, Montevideo, a ward of Montevideo, Uruguay
 San Acacia, New Mexico, an unincorporated community, United States

See also
 Acacia Park (disambiguation)
 Acacius